Hrušovany may refer to places:

Czech Republic
Hrušovany (Chomutov District), a municipality and village in the Ústí nad Labem Region
Hrušovany, a village and part of Polepy (Litoměřice District) in the Ústí nad Labem Region
Hrušovany nad Jevišovkou, a town in the South Moravian Region
Hrušovany u Brna, a municipality and village in the South Moravian Region

Slovakia
Hrušovany, Topoľčany District, a municipality in the Nitra Region